Renato Constantino (March 10, 1919 – September 15, 1999) was a Filipino historian known for being part of the leftist tradition of Philippine historiography. Apart from being a historian, Constantino was also engaged in foreign service, working for the Philippine Mission to the United Nations and the Department of Foreign Affairs.

For his academic contributions to the fight against the Marcos dictatorship, his name is inscribed on the Wall of Remembrance at the Philippines' Bantayog ng mga Bayani (Monument of Heroes).

He is the father of former Civil Service Commission Chairperson Karina Constantino-David and father-in-law of University of the Philippines Diliman sociology professor emeritus Randy David.

Education and early career
Constantino attended the University of the Philippines where he became the youngest editor of the university's student publication, The Philippine Collegian. He wrote editorial columns criticizing President Manuel Quezon, which earned the attention of the President by responding to the article in one of his speeches. When the Second World War erupted, Constantino fought in Bataan and was a member of an intelligence team spying on the Japanese. He also worked as a journalist during the war.

At the conclusion of the war, Constantino joined the Philippine Mission to the United Nations from 1946 to 1949 as its Executive Secretary. He worked as a counselor for the Department of Foreign Affairs from 1949 to 1951. These exposures to foreign service became the foundations of a book he wrote about the United Nations.

Academic career
Constantino held professorial positions at the University of the Philippines (Diliman and Manila), Far Eastern University, Adamson University, and Arellano University. He was also a visiting lecturer in universities in London, Sweden, Japan, Germany, Malaysia and Thailand. He served as a member of the Editorial Board of the Journal of Contemporary Asia, and Trustee of Focus on the Global South in Bangkok.

He wrote around 30 books and numerous pamphlets and monographs. Among Constantino's well-known books are A Past Revisited and The Continuing Past. He also wrote The Making of a Filipino (a biography of Claro M. Recto), The Essential Tañada (On Statesman and Senator Lorenzo M. Tañada), Neo-colonial Identity and Counter-Consciousness, and The Nationalist Alternative. Several of his books have been translated into Japanese and The Nationalist Alternative has a Malaysian translation.

Constantino earned various distinctions for his historical work. He received nationalism awards from Quezon City in 1987, Manila in 1988, The Civil Liberties Union in 1988, and the University of the Philippines Manila in 1989. Constantino was also the Manila's Diwa ng Lahi awardee in 1989. He was conferred the Doctor of Arts and Letters (honoris causa) from the Polytechnic University of the Philippines in 1989 and a Doctor of Laws (honoris causa) from the University of the Philippines Diliman in 1990.

Works
The Miseducation of the Filipino (1959)
Recto Reader: Excerpts from the Speeches of Claro M. Recto (1965)
Veneration Without Understanding (1969)
The Making of a Filipino: A Story of Philippine Colonial Politics (1969)
Dissent and Counter-consciousness (1970)
A History of the Philippines (with Letizia R. Constantino; 1975)
The Philippines: A Past Revisited (1975)
Philippines: A Continuing Past (with Letizia R. Constantino; 1978)
The Aquino Watch (1987)
Demystifying Aquino (1989)
The Essential Tañada (1989)
History: Myths and Reality (1992)

References

External links
Biography 
Profile at Bantayog ng mga Bayani

1919 births
1999 deaths
20th-century Filipino historians
Historians of Southeast Asia
Historians of the Philippines
University of the Philippines alumni
Individuals honored at the Bantayog ng mga Bayani
Filipino expatriates in the United States
Philippine Collegian editors